Karl von Lützow (25 December 1832 – 22 April 1897) was a German art historian and critic.

Biography
He was born in Göttingen. From 1851 to 1856 he studied philology and archæology at the universities of Göttingen, where he became member of Burschenschaft Hannovera (fraternity), and Munich, where he was a favored student of Friedrich Wilhelm Thiersch. He was associated in Berlin with Wilhelm Lübke in editing Denkmäler der Kunst.

He was appointed docent of art history at the University of Munich in 1858, then edited in Vienna the Rezensionen und Mittheilungen über bildende Kunst. In 1864 he became a professor at the Academy of Fine Arts in Vienna, where in 1866 he was also made librarian and director of the cabinet of engravings. In 1867 he was appointed professor of architectural history at the Technische Hochschule.

Works
His publications include:
 Münchener Antiken (7 vols., 1861–69).
 Die Meisterwerke der Kirchenbaukunst (2nd edition 1871).
 Die Geschichte der kaiserlich-königlichen Akademie der bildenden Künste (1877).
 Die vervielfältigende Kunst der Gegenwart (1886; et seq.).
 Die Kunstschätze Italiens in geographisch-historischer Uebersicht geschildert (second edition, 1900).
 Published in English: Monuments of art, showing its development and progress from the earliest artistic attempts to the present period (with Wilhelm Lübke); translation of Denkmäler der Kunst.
 Geschichte des deutschen Kupferstichs und Holzschnitts (History of German copperplate and wood engraving, 1891).

He founded the Zeitschrift für bildende Kunst (Leipzig, 1866, et seq.), of which he was editor up to the time of his death.

References

References

German art historians
1832 births
1897 deaths
German librarians
German critics
German curators
Writers from Göttingen
University of Göttingen alumni
Ludwig Maximilian University of Munich alumni
Academic staff of the Ludwig Maximilian University of Munich
German male non-fiction writers